Prairie Township is the name of six townships in the U.S. state of Indiana:

 Prairie Township, Henry County, Indiana
 Prairie Township, Kosciusko County, Indiana
 Prairie Township, LaPorte County, Indiana
 Prairie Township, Tipton County, Indiana
 Prairie Township, Warren County, Indiana
 Prairie Township, White County, Indiana

See also
Prairie Township (disambiguation)

Indiana township disambiguation pages